The Transfiguration Church in Kovalyovo (Tserkov Spasa na Kovalyove) 
in Novgorodsky District, Novgorod Oblast, Russia, was built around 1345. The church was notable for the frescoes created in the 14th century. The church was destroyed to the ground during World War II and restored in 1970. Fragments of the frescoes have since been reconstructed. The Transfiguration Church in Kovalyovo was designated an architectural monument of federal significance (#5310100000).

History
The church was built as the katholikon of the small Kovalyovo Monastery. It was commissioned around 1345 by a boyar named Ontsifor Zhabin. The southern annex is thought to have been designed as the burial vault of the Zhabin family.  The frescoes were painted ca. 1380. 

During the Second World War, between 1941 and 1943, the church was destroyed. After the war, the ruins were conserved. In the 1960s, fragments of the frescoes were restored. In 1970, the church was rebuilt to a design by Leonid Krasnorechyev.

Architecture
The church is constructed in brick, and has one dome. It has a single apse and four square columns. This design is typical for pre-Mongol Novgorod churches. There are two auxiliary chapels of different size flanking the main building from the south and from the north. The south chapel has a set of limestone crosses inserted in the walls. The system of vault roofing features three semicircular wall gables (zakomara) which hark back to the pre-Mongol period. The pillars are square rather than circular or octagonal, as was typical for the 14th century.

Frescoes
The frescoes, created ca. 1380, covered the apse, the inner surface of the dome, the southern and the northern walls of the church, some of the pillars, and the interior of the western chapel. They were sponsored by Afanasy Stepanovich and his wife. The frescoes are thought to have been painted by a team of Balkan (possibly Serbian) painters. Their static and hieratic style has little in common with other Novgorodian frescoes of the period; but it shares similarities with the older Byzantine tradition.

The interior of the dome was filled with images of the prophets. But it is the images of warrior saints that predominate. This is usually explained by the fact that in the 1370s the Grand Duchy of Moscow, with the support of other Russian states, was preparing to fight against the Golden Horde, culminating in 1380 with the Battle of Kulikovo. There is also the first Russian image of the dead Jesus Christ in the tomb.

References

Churches completed in 1345
14th-century Eastern Orthodox church buildings
Churches in Novgorod Oblast
Medieval Eastern Orthodox church buildings in Russia
Russian Orthodox church buildings in Russia
Cultural heritage monuments of federal significance in Novgorod Oblast